Speed Queen  may refer to:

Speed Queen, an American manufacturer of laundry machines
Speed Queen, a brand of fiberglass boat manufactured by Glastex from 1953 to 1962
Speed Queen (comics), a fictional supervillain